Willy Olsen (born 28 February 1950) is a retired Norwegian speed skater from Tynset who competed internationally in the 1970s. His strength was on the long distances, and he won the 5000 metres' distance at the national championship in 1972. At the 1972 Winter Olympics in Sapporo he finished 5th in the 5000 metres.

Olsen joined the first professional league, International Speed Skating League, in 1973. After the dissolution of the league in 1974, Olsen became a speed skating coach.

References

External links

1950 births
Living people
Norwegian male speed skaters
Norwegian speed skating coaches
Speed skaters at the 1972 Winter Olympics
Olympic speed skaters of Norway
People from Tynset
Sportspeople from Innlandet